Vincent Biruta (born July 19, 1958) is a Rwandan physician and politician, who is serving as the Minister of Foreign Affairs, having been appointed in November 2019. Previously, he served as the Minister for Environment in the Rwandan cabinet, since August 31, 2017. Immediately prior to his appointment to the environment docket, he served as the Minister of Natural resources, since July 24, 2014.

Background and education
He was born on 19th July 1958. He is a trained physician. He also holds post-graduate qualifications in planning and management of health services in developing countries, obtained from Université libre de Bruxelles, in Belgium.

Career
Dr. Biruta has a long civil services record in Rwanda, post the 1994 genocide. From 1997 until 1999, he served as the Minister of Health. From 1999 until 2000, he served as the Minister of Public Works, Transport and Communications.

He was the President of the Transitional National Assembly from January 2000 until 2003. From August 2003, until October 2011, he was the President of the Rwandan Senate, the upper chamber of the bicameral Parliament of Rwanda.

In December 2011, he was named the Minister of Education, serving in that capacity until July 2014, when he was named Minister of Natural Resources.

As foreign minister, Biruta agreed the Rwanda asylum plan with British Home Secretary Priti Patel.

See also
 Politics of Rwanda

References

External links
 Rwanda in crisis as President resigns AP Thursday March 23, 2000.

Living people
1958 births
Rwandan physicians
Presidents of the Senate (Rwanda)
Communication ministers of Rwanda
Education ministers of Rwanda
Environment ministers of Rwanda
Foreign ministers of Rwanda
Health ministers of Rwanda
Natural resources ministers of Rwanda
Public works ministers of Rwanda
Transport ministers of Rwanda
Université libre de Bruxelles
Social Democratic Party (Rwanda) politicians